The Under Secretary for Science and Innovation, formerly the Under Secretary for Science and Energy, is a high-ranking position within the United States Department of Energy. The position was created by the Energy Policy Act of 2005, and the first Under Secretary for Science, Raymond L. Orbach, was sworn in on June 1, 2006. The under secretary is appointed by the president of the United States and confirmed by the United States Senate.  In March 2009, Steven E. Koonin was nominated to replace Orbach. Franklin (Lynn) M. Orr was sworn in as the Under Secretary for Science and Energy on December 17, 2014, and served in this position through the end of the Obama administration.  The most recent under secretary was Paul Dabbar.

The under secretary serves as the Secretary of Energy's Science and Technology advisor, monitors the Department of Energy's research and development programs, and advises the secretary on any gaps or duplications in them. The under secretary advises the secretary on the management and the state of the national laboratories overseen by the department.

The under secretary also advises the secretary on the department's educational and training activities. Other aspects include advising the secretary on the coordinating and planning of research activities, advising the secretary on financial assistance for research activities, and carrying out additional duties assigned by the secretary, including supervising and supporting the lower-ranking Assistant Secretaries' research activities. In the words of the Act, the under secretary is required to have "extensive background in science or engineering fields," and to be "well qualified to manage the civilian research and development programs of the Department."

The office was reorganized in 2022 to include the Assistant Secretary of Energy (Energy Efficiency and Renewable Energy), Assistant Secretary of Energy (Fossil Energy and Carbon Management), Assistant Secretary of Energy (Electricity), and Assistant Secretary of Energy (Nuclear Energy), among other programs.

References

External links